The African keeled mud turtle (Pelusios carinatus) is a species of turtle in the family Pelomedusidae.
It is endemic to  central Africa : the Democratic Republic of the Congo, the Republic of the Congo, and Gabon.

References

Bibliography

African keeled mud turtle
Reptiles of Central Africa
Reptiles of the Democratic Republic of the Congo
Reptiles of the Republic of the Congo
Reptiles of Gabon
African keeled mud turtle
Taxa named by Raymond Laurent